Nationality words link to articles with information on the nation's poetry or literature (for instance, Irish or France).

Events
 February – A year after the death of poet John Philips, Edmund Smith prints a "Poem to the Memory of Mr John Philips". Other memorials to the poet this year include "A Poem to the Memory of the Incomparable Mr Philips" by Leonard Welsted, and a monument in his memory is erected by Lord Harcourt in Westminster Abbey, between those to Chaucer and Drayton, with the motto "Honos erit huic quoque pomo" from the title page of Philips' work Cyder.
 October – The Medley, a literary periodical, first issued; founded by Arthur Maynwaring, contributors included Richard Steele, John Oldmixon; weekly to August, 1711
 November – The Examiner, a literary periodical, first issued, founded by Henry St. John, Francis Atterbury, Matthew Prior and John Freind; initially edited by William King, also edited by Jonathan Swift, who was also a major contributor; weekly to June 1711

Works published
 William Congreve, The Works of Mr. William Congreve, in three volumes
 George Farquhar, Barcellona: a poem; or, the Spanish expedition under the command of Charles Earl of Peterborough, epic
 Ambrose Philips, Pastorals
 John Wilmot, Earl of Rochester, Poems on Several Occasions: with Valentinian; a Tragedy. To which is added, Advice to a Painter. Written by the Right Honourable John, late Earl of Rochester, London: Printed by H. Hills & sold by the booksellers of London & Westminster, posthumous

Births
Death years link to the corresponding "[year] in poetry" article:
 6 February – Paul Whitehead (died 1774), English satiric poet
 22 May – James Hammond (died 1742), English poet and politician
 27 November – Robert Lowth (died 1787), English Bishop of the Church of England, poet, professor of poetry at the University of Oxford and grammarian, author of one of the most influential textbooks on English grammar
 Also:
 Angom Gopi (died 1780), Meitei language poet, writer and translator
 George Alexander Stevens (died 1780), English playwright and poet

Deaths
Birth years link to the corresponding "[year] in poetry" article:
 1 November – Michael Kongehl (born 1646), German baroque poet
 15 December (bur.) – Lady Mary Chudleigh (born 1656), English poet and essayist

See also

Poetry
List of years in poetry
List of years in literature
 18th century in poetry
 18th century in literature
 Augustan poetry

Notes

External links
 "A Timeline of English Poetry" Web page of the Representative Poetry Online Web site, University of Toronto

18th-century poetry
Poetry